Neil McInnes may refer to:
Neil McInnes (1924–2017), Australian intellectual, journalist and public servant
Neil McInnes (politician) (Neil Malcolm McInnes, 1924–2005), Australian politician)
Neil McInnes (bowls) (born 1928), former United States international lawn and indoor bowler